Moses L. Herring (August 24, 1895 – January 12, 1931) was an American baseball third baseman in the Negro leagues. He played with the St. Louis Giants in 1920.

References

External links
 and Seamheads

St. Louis Giants players
1895 births
1931 deaths
Baseball third basemen
Baseball players from South Carolina
People from Abbeville, South Carolina
20th-century African-American sportspeople